Harmonia is a visual novel developed by Key and published by VisualArt's in 2016. The story is set in a world where artificially intelligent, emotional androids called Phiroids were developed before a rapid decline in human civilization. An emotionless young man named Rei with a mechanical right hand is cared for by a girl in a small town as he gradually learns how to express emotions. The discography of Harmonia consists of one single, one soundtrack and one remix album. The core of the discography is the original soundtrack album produced by Key Sounds Label in 2017. The music on the soundtrack was composed and arranged by Shinji Orito, Ryō Mizutsuki, Tomohiro Takeshita, Yūichirō Tsukagoshi and Meeon.

Albums

Harmonia Original Soundtrack
The Harmonia Original Soundtrack, from the visual novel Harmonia, was bundled with the game when it was released for general sale on May 26, 2017 in Japan. The album is produced by Key Sounds Label bearing the catalog number KSLA-0134. The album contains one disc with 17 music tracks composed, arranged and produced by Shinji Orito, Ryō Mizutsuki, Tomohiro Takeshita, Yūichirō Tsukagoshi and Meeon. Ayaka Kitazawa sings "Todoketai Melody Short Ver" and Haruka Shimotsuki sings "Towa no Hoshi e".

Teneritas
Teneritas is a remix album with music tracks taken from the Harmonia visual novel and arranged into piano versions. It was bundled with the game when it was released for general sale on May 26, 2017 in Japan. The album is produced by Key Sounds Label bearing the catalog number KSLA-0135. The album contains one disc with 11 tracks. The album is composed and produced by Shinji Orito, Ryō Mizutsuki and Tomohiro Takeshita; tracks are arranged by Mizutsuki.

Todoketai Melody / Towa no Hoshi e
 is a single from the visual novel Harmonia containing the game's theme songs sung by Ayaka Kitazawa and Haruka Shimotsuki. It was released on April 11, 2015 by Key Sounds Label bearing the catalog number KSLA-0100. The single contains four tracks including the original and instrumental versions of "Todoketai Melody" and "Towa no Hoshi e". The single is composed, arranged and produced by Shinji Orito, Tomohiro Takeshita, Yūichirō Tsukagoshi and Meeon.

References

Discographies of Japanese artists
Key Sounds Label
Video game music discographies